The 1907–08 Drake Bulldogs men's basketball team represents Drake University in the 1907–08 college basketball season. The team was led by second year head coach C.A. Pell. This was also Drakes first season as a member of the Missouri Valley Intercollegiate Athletic Association. They finished with a 2–1 record the previous season.

Schedule

Notes

Drake Bulldogs
Drake Bulldogs men's basketball seasons
Drake Bulldogs men's basketball
Drake Bulldogs men's basketball